The 1968 Major League Baseball season was contested from April 10 to October 10, 1968. It was the final year of baseball's pre-expansion era, in which the teams that finished in first place in each league went directly to the World Series to face each other for the "World Championship." 

It also featured the most dominant pitching year of the modern era, and was the first season for the Athletics in Oakland (having moved from Kansas City after the  season).

The rookie minimum salary, $7,000 in 1967, was increased to $10,000 in 1968.

The Year of the Pitcher
In Major League Baseball, the trend throughout the 1960s was of increased pitching dominance, caused by enforcing a larger strike zone (top of armpit to bottom of knee) beginning in 1963. The delicate balance of power between offense and defense reached its greatest tilt in favor of the pitcher by 1968.

During what later became known as "the year of the pitcher", Bob Gibson led the National League with 268 strikeouts, but also setting a modern earned run average record of 1.12 (a record regarded to be unbreakable today) and a still-standing World Series record of 17 strikeouts in Game 1, while their World Series opponent Denny McLain of the Detroit Tigers won 31 regular season games, the only player to reach the 30 win milestone since Dizzy Dean in 1934. His teammate Mickey Lolich won three complete games in the World Series, the last player to ever do so. Don Drysdale of the L.A. Dodgers pitched six consecutive shutout games in May and June, ending with 58 2/3 scoreless innings - a record that stood until being beaten by Orel Hershiser in 1988. Juan Marichal of the San Francisco Giants led the majors with 26 wins and 30 complete games. Luis Tiant of the Cleveland Indians had the American League's lowest ERA at 1.60 and allowed a opponents batting average of only .168, a major league record (since broken by Pedro Martínez in ). He also led the AL with 9 shutouts. Both MVPs for that year were pitchers.

339 shutouts were recorded in 1,619 regular-season games. The St. Louis Cardinals alone pitched 30 shutouts, the most in the majors. The 472 runs they allowed remains the lowest total ever recorded by any major league team in a 162-game season.  

Ray Washburn of the Cardinals pitched a no-hitter against the Giants for a 2-0 victory on September 18th at Candlestick Park. The day before, Gaylord Perry pitched a no-hitter with a 1-0 Giants victory over the Cardinals. It was the first time in baseball history that no-hitters had been thrown in consecutive games and also that back-to-back no-hitters occurred in the same series.

Hitting was anemic. Carl Yastrzemski of the Boston Red Sox had the lowest batting average of any league champion when his .301 was good enough for the American League batting title. The AL's collective slugging average of .339 remains the lowest since 1915 (when the game was still in the so-called dead-ball era), while the collective batting average of .230 is the all-time lowest. The Chicago White Sox scored only 463 runs during the regular season and were shut out a league-high 23 times. The shutout record was eclipsed in 1972 by the Texas Rangers, who were blanked 26 times in 154 games. 

Four expansion teams joined the majors, and batting averages in  returned to their historical averages; the large statistical advantage of pitching over batting in the major leagues during 1968 has not been seen since.

Awards and honors
Baseball Hall of Fame
Kiki Cuyler
Goose Goslin
Joe Medwick
Most Valuable Player
Denny McLain, Detroit Tigers, P (AL) 
Bob Gibson, St. Louis Cardinals, P (NL)
Cy Young Award
Denny McLain, Detroit Tigers (AL)
Bob Gibson, St. Louis Cardinals (NL) 
Rookie of the Year 
Stan Bahnsen, New York Yankees, P (AL)
Johnny Bench, Cincinnati Reds, C (NL)
Gold Glove Award
George Scott (1B) (AL) 
Bobby Knoop (2B) (AL) 
Brooks Robinson (3B) (AL) 
Luis Aparicio (SS) (AL) 
Reggie Smith (OF) (AL) 
Mickey Stanley (OF) (AL) 
Carl Yastrzemski (OF) (AL)
Bill Freehan (C) (AL) 
Jim Kaat (P) (AL)

Statistical leaders

Standings

American League

National League

Postseason

Bracket

Home Field Attendance

Events
May 1 – Philadelphia Phillies pitcher John Boozer is ejected from a game against the New York Mets at Shea Stadium without throwing a pitch. Boozer had put spit on his hand to clean his uniform, which was in contravention of the anti-spitball rule that had been introduced that year. After calling him for that indiscretion and two further examples, umpire Ed Vargo ejected Boozer.

See also
1968 Nippon Professional Baseball season

References

External links
1968 Major League Baseball season schedule

 
Major League Baseball seasons